The Panmunjom Declaration for Peace, Prosperity and Reunification of the Korean Peninsula was adopted between the Supreme Leader of North Korea, Kim Jong-un, and the President of South Korea, Moon Jae-in, on 27 April 2018, during the 2018 inter-Korean Summit on the South Korean side of the Peace House in the Joint Security Area.

According to the declaration, the governments of North Korea and South Korea agreed to cooperate on officially ending the Korean War and the Korean conflict, beginning a new era of peace and sharing commitments in ending divisions and confrontation by approaching a new era of national reconciliation, peace, reunification and prosperity and improvements to inter-Korean communication and relations.

This declaration agreed that both sides would "make active efforts to seek the support and cooperation of the international community for the denuclearization of the Korean peninsula".

The declaration  was submitted to the United Nations General Assembly on 6 September 2018.

Summary of the Panmunjom Declaration

 A full translation of the text of the Panmunjom Declaration can be found in Wikisource. Below is a summary of the declaration.

See also
 
 
Korean Armistice Agreement
April 2018 inter-Korean summit
2018 North Korea–United States Singapore Summit
Korean reunification

Notes

References

 Panmunjom Declaration for Peace, Prosperity and Unification of the Korean Peninsula, 27 April 2018

North Korea–South Korea relations
2018 in North Korea
2018 in South Korea
2018 in international relations
2018 documents
Panmunjom